Portrait of Charles V may refer to one of several works by Titian:
 Portrait of Charles V, Alte Pinakothek, Munich
 Portrait of Charles V, Museo di Capodimonte, Naples
 Portrait of Charles V with a Dog, Prado, Madrid
 Equestrian Portrait of Charles V, Prado, Madrid

Charles V
Charles V